Mercy Moim (born ) is a Kenyan volleyball player. She played with the Kenya national team in the 2010 FIVB Women's Volleyball World Championship. She was team captain for the postponed 2020 Summer Olympics in Tokyo (the only women's volleyball team from Africa).

Life
Moim made her debut in the national team at the age of 15 and she has played for the Supreme Volleyball Club in Thailand.

Moim was chosen to captain Kenya's team in 2016. In 2021 Kenya qualified for the Olympic games which was the first time in sixteen years. She was again the captain for the postponed 2020 Summer Olympics in Tokyo by the coach Paul Bitok. Veteran Jane Wacu also made the cut former colleagues Violet Makuto and Elizabeth Wanyama were not included in the dozen players chosen to travel where they lost their first match against the home team from Japan.

Moim and rugby player Andrew Amonde were chosen to be Kenya's flagbearers at the Olympics opening ceremony in Tokyo. Moim was the second woman to be given this honour following archer Shazad Anwar in 2016.

Clubs
  Kenya Commercial Bank (2005–2006)
  Kenya Prisons (2007–2014)
  Liiga Ploki (2014–2015)
  Oriveden Ponnistus (2015–2016)
  Azerrail Baku (2016–2017)
  Supreme Chonburi (2019–2020)
  Kenya Commercial Bank (2020–)

Awards

Club
 2018–19 Thailand League -  Runner-Up, with Supreme Chonburi

References

1989 births
Living people
Kenyan women's volleyball players
Volleyball players at the 2020 Summer Olympics
Olympic volleyball players of Kenya
People from Trans-Nzoia County